Center/Main St is a station on the Metro light rail line in Mesa, Arizona, United States. The station is located one block east of the intersection of East Main Street and North Center Street and opened on August 22, 2015.

Nearby landmarks
 Downtown Mesa
 Mesa Arts Center
 Mesa City Plaza, city government offices
 Benedictine University
 Mesa Convention Center and Amphitheater
 Mesa Library, main branch
 Arizona Museum of Natural History

References

External links
 Valley Metro map

Valley Metro Rail stations
Transportation in Mesa, Arizona
Railway stations in the United States opened in 2015
Buildings and structures in Mesa, Arizona
2015 establishments in Arizona